Lindley is an unincorporated community in Grundy and Sullivan counties, in the U.S. state of Missouri.

History
Lindley was platted in 1845, and named after James J. Lindley, a state legislator.  A post office called Lindley was established in 1854, and remained in operation until 1906.

References

Unincorporated communities in Grundy County, Missouri
Unincorporated communities in Sullivan County, Missouri
Unincorporated communities in Missouri